MyLogIQ is a provider of SEC compliance and disclosure intelligence products. Headquartered in San Juan, Puerto Rico, with offices in  Sydney, Australia, MyLogIQ provides 360° public company intelligence related to SEC disclosures and comment letters, ESG metrics, corporate governance practices, executive and director compensation, and proxy voting.

Business
The company offers financial data (XBRL, as reported) and on-demand solutions through its SEC Analyzer software as a service (SAAS) to accounting firms, corporations, law firms, and investment professionals. MyLogIQ provides data from United States Securities and Exchange Commission (SEC) public filings to aid professionals with financial analysis and SEC compliance and disclosure.

The SEC Analyzer's precursor, Company IQ, was named Top New Product of 2010 by Accounting Today.

History
The company was founded in San Jose, California in 2001. 
Since 2001, MyLogIQ has focused on mining unstructured data from SEC filings, converting that data into structured information.
 2002 - MyLogIQ began extracting executive compensation and corporate governance information from SEC filings for US companies, in addition to providing data and business intelligence applications to major human resource consulting firms.
 2005 - under the brand name GuerdonData, MyLogIQ began providing data and business intelligence solutions based on Australian executive compensation and corporate governance information disclosed to the Australian Stock Exchange (ASX).
 2006 - MyLogIQ licensed proprietary technology to Thompson-Reuters, enabling them to replace manual, labor-intensive data collection processes with their automated, technology-enabled processes. MyLogIQ's technology allowed them to precisely and quickly extract fundamental data and information from companies' annual and quarterly filings, current events (8-K) filings, and earnings releases filed with the SEC and SEDAR (Canada).
 2008-09 - at an XBRL conference, MyLogIQ's proprietary technology produced the first full XBRL compliant report (fundamental tables and all footnote disclosures) mapped to historical financial data. Equipped with a historical database, they help hedge funds and banks identify critical money-making trends.
 2010 - MyLogIQ introduced the SEC Analyzer Research Platform. Powered by a decade of experience, the SEC Analyzer delivers precise compliance and disclosure intelligence to markets all over the world.

Products
MyLogIQ released the SEC Analyzer in June 2011.  The SEC Analyzer is available as a Software As A Service (SAAS) to ensure privacy and confidentiality.  It contains two product components: Catalog & Disclosure and Compliance. Compliance gives users access to over 1 Million matched SEC comments and responses.  Catalog & Disclosure provides disclosure, contract, and Risk Factor precedence across SEC filings and industries.

Some may recognize the Compliance component as MyLogIQ's Company IQ, which was released in 2010.

Media

MyLogIQ also compiles data for academic and media interest. Most recently, MyLogIQ supplied data for AgendaWeek, Joann S. Lublin, Theo Francis, Inti Pacheco, and Jieqian Zhang from The Wall Street Journal. In the past MyLogIQ has supplied data to various organizations and individuals, including Jason Zweig from Wall Street Journal and Broc Romanek from CorporateCounsel.net.

References

Financial services companies of the United States
Privately held companies of Puerto Rico
Companies established in 2001